Sweden was represented by Fame in the Eurovision Song Contest 2003 with the song "Give Me Your Love".

Before Eurovision

Melodifestivalen 2003 

Sweden chose their entry for the Eurovision Song Contest 2003 in the national selection Melodifestivalen 2003. Just like the year before, four heats and a "second chance" round with eight songs in each were held. 2 from each went to the final. The winner was chosen by 11 regional juries (50%) and televoting (50%) were Fame consisting of Jessica Andersson and Magnus Bäcklund. Their song, written by Calle Kindbom and Carl Lösnitz, was called "Give Me Your Love", and was a typical schlager–disco song.

Heats and Viewers' Choice round 

 The first heat took place on 15 February 2003. "Let Your Spirit Fly" performed by Pernilla Wahlgren and Jan Johansen and "Crazy in Love" performed by Jill Johnson qualified directly to the final, while "Carnaval" performed by Méndez and "Television" performed by Markus Landgren advanced to the Viewers' Choice round. "Stronger" performed by Crosstalk, "Someone, Somewhere, Someday" performed by DeDe Lopez, "Ingen annan" performed by Alive feat. Jessie Martins and "Stop! Look! Listen!" performed by Da Buzz were eliminated from the contest.
 The second heat took place on 22 February 2003. "Give Me Your Love" performed by Fame and "Hela världen för mig" performed by Sanna Nielsen qualified directly to the final, while "Not a Sinner nor a Saint" performed by Alcazar and "15 minuter" performed by Brandsta City Släckers advanced to the Viewers' Choice round. "Just Like a Boomerang" performed by Andrés Esteche, "Let's Go" performed by Kerli and the Locatellis, "You" performed by Pandora and "Better Believe It" performed by Aleena were eliminated from the contest.
 The third heat took place on 1 March 2003. "Genom eld och vatten" performed by Sarek and "Bye Bye" performed by Barbados qualified directly to the final, while "Stay the Night" performed by Style and "Love Is All" performed by Liverpool advanced to the Viewers' Choice round. "Tonight's the Night" performed by Shanna Smith, "Evig kärlek" performed by Nanne Grönvall, "My Love" performed by Sofia Källgren and Robert Wells and "Mr. Memory" performed by Shirley Clamp were eliminated from the contest.
 The fourth heat took place on 8 March 2003. "Maria" performed by Östen med Resten and "Aqua Playa" performed by Afro-dite qualified directly to the final, while "TKO (Knock You Out)" performed by Bubbles and "Nothing Can Stop Me" performed by Lina Hedlund advanced to the Viewers' Choice round. "We're Unbreakable" performed by Sahlene, "No dudes en llamarme" performed by Fernando Brito, "He Is Always on My Mind" performed by Maarja and "Tills jag mötte dig" performed by Mikael Erlandsson were eliminated from the contest.
 The Viewers' Choice round (Tittarnas val) took place on 9 March 2003. "Not a Sinner nor a Saint" performed by Alcazar and "TKO (Knock You Out)" performed by Bubbles qualified to the final.

Final 
The final took place on 15 March 2003 at the Globe Arena in Stockholm.

At Eurovision 
On the night of the final Fame performed 25th in the running order, following Romania and preceding Slovenia. At the close of voting "Give Me Your Love" had received 107 points, placing country 5th of the 26 entries. This result meant that Sweden automatically qualified for the final in the 2004 contest.

Voting

References

2003
Countries in the Eurovision Song Contest 2003
Eurovision
Eurovision